How Do You Do may refer to:

How Do You Do (Miyuki Nakajima album)
How Do You Do (Mayer Hawthorne album)
"How Do You Do!", a song by Roxette
"How Do You Do?" (beFour song)
"How Do You Do" (Mouth & MacNeal song)
"How Do You Do" (Shakira song)
"How Do You Do?", a song by the Boomtown Rats released as the B-side to "Like Clockwork"
"How Do You Do?", a song from the Disney film Song of the South
"How Do You Do?", a song from the Wee Sing film The Marvelous Musical Mansion

See also
 How Are You (disambiguation)
 How Have You Been (disambiguation)
 How You Been (disambiguation)